Radio-Television Transmitting Centre Rachocin, situated by Sierpc/Rachocin on the north-west Masovian Voivodeship. Is a 261-metre guyed steel mast.

The mast was built to the purpose of the broadcasting of a radio signal and television on the large area. Under the reach of this RTCN a north-western part Masovian Voivodeship and an eastern part Kuyavian-Pomeranian Voivodeship, are including such cities as: Sierpc, Płock, Lipno, Rypin, Włocławek, Toruń, Ciechanów, Brodnica, or Działdowo, Lidzbark Warmiński and Mława. Is an owner from EmiTel company.

Transmitted Programmes

Digital television MPEG-4

FM Radio

See also

 List of masts

External links
 http://emi.emitel.pl/EMITEL/obiekty.aspx?obiekt=DODR_E1E
 http://radiopolska.pl/wykaz/pokaz_lokalizacja.php?pid=116
 http://www.przelaczenie.eu/mapy/mazowieckie
 http://www.dvbtmap.eu/mapcoverage.html?chid=3760

Radio masts and towers in Poland
Sierpc County